Gerard "Gerry" J. Cassidy is an American politician and former political advisor serving as a member of the Massachusetts House of Representatives from the 9th Plymouth District.

Background 
Cassidy is a native of Brockton, Massachusetts, where he attended Brockton High School. From 28 years, Cassidy served as a legislative aide to Thomas P. Kennedy. From 2000 to 2003, Cassidy served as a member of the Brockton City Council. In 2015, he was elected to the Massachusetts House of Representatives, succeeding Michael Brady, who was elected to the Massachusetts Senate. He assumed office in 2016. Cassidy is a member of the Democratic Party.

References

Living people
21st-century American politicians
Democratic Party members of the Massachusetts House of Representatives
People from Brockton, Massachusetts
Year of birth missing (living people)